John Alexander Guy (born 16 January 1949) is a British historian and biographer.

Biography
Born in Warragul, Victoria, Australia, Guy moved to Britain with his parents in 1952. He was educated at King Edward VII School in Lytham St Annes in Lancashire, and Clare College, Cambridge, where he read history, achieving a First. At Cambridge, Guy studied under the Tudor specialist Geoffrey Rudolph Elton. He was awarded a Greene Cup by Clare College and the Yorke Prize by the University of Cambridge.

During his academic career, Guy has held posts at St Andrews University (where he is Honorary Professor and was sometime Vice-Principal for Research), Bristol University, UC Berkeley, Rochester and Johns Hopkins. Guy currently teaches at Cambridge University, as a fellow of Clare College, where he teaches part-time so he can devote more time to his writing and broadcasting career.

Guy specializes in the history of Tudor England and has written extensively on the subject including juvenile books. His books have been critically acclaimed, with My Heart is My Own: the Life of Mary Queen of Scots, being awarded the 2004 Whitbread Biography Award. This book and Queen of Scots: The True Life of Mary Stuart served as inspiration for the 2018 film Mary Queen of Scots.

He is the author of A Daughter's Love: Thomas More and his daughter Meg, 2009, and Elizabeth: the forgotten years, 2016.

Guy's style is one of re-assessment and evaluation; his works often involve him re-telling and re-evaluating history from a novel viewpoint.

Personal life 
He is married to author Julia Fox, a former history teacher, who wrote Jane Boleyn: The Infamous Lady Rochford.

Bibliography
 Tudor England (1988). Oxford: Oxford University Press. .
 The Tudors: A Very Short Introduction (2000). Oxford: Oxford University Press. 
 My Heart is my Own: The life of Mary, Queen of Scots (2004). New York City: Harper Perennial. .
 Queen of Scots: The True Life of Mary Stuart (2005). Boston: Mariner Books. .
 Thomas Becket: Warrior, Priest, Rebel, A 900-year-old story retold (2012). New York City: Viking Books. .
 The Children of Henry VIII (2013). Oxford: Oxford University Press. .
 Henry VIII: The Quest for Fame (2014). London: Allen Lane. .
 Elizabeth: The Forgotten Years (2016). New York City: Viking Books. .
 Thomas More: A Very Brief History (2017). London: SPCK Publishing. .
 Gresham's Law: The Life and World of Queen Elizabeth I's Banker (2019). London: Profile Books. .

References

University of St Andrews: Professor John Guy
Biography on Guy's own website
British Council  contemporary writers page

External links
Tudors.org – History lectures, essays and notes written by John Guy

Guy, John
Guy, John
Guy, John
Guy, John
Guy, John
Academics of the University of Cambridge
People from Warragul
Australian emigrants to England